Otto IV may refer to:

Otto IV, Count of Wittelsbach (c. 1083 – 1156) 
Otto IV, Holy Roman Emperor (1175–1218)
Otto IV, Count of Ravensberg (c.  1276–1328)
Otto IV, Count of Burgundy (1248–1302)
Otto IV, Margrave of Brandenburg-Stendal (c. 1238 – 1308 or 1309)
Otto IV, the Merry (1301–1339), Duke of Austria
Otto IV, Duke of Lower Bavaria (1307–1334)
Otto IV, Prince of Anhalt-Bernburg (d. 1415)
Otto IV, Duke of Brunswick-Lüneburg or Otto the Lame (d. 1446), Prince of Lüneburg
Otto IV, Count of Waldeck (c. 1440–1494), of Landau
Otto IV, Count of Rietberg (d. 1553)
Otto IV of Schaumburg (1517–1576)

See also 
 Otto I (disambiguation)
 Otto II (disambiguation)
 Otto III (disambiguation)
 Otto V (disambiguation)
 Otto VI
 Otto VII (disambiguation)
 Otto VIII (disambiguation)